Teruzakura Hiroyuki  (born 5 December 1947 as Hiroyuki Ozaki) is a former sumo wrestler from Minoo, Osaka, Japan. He made his professional debut in May 1964, and reached the top division in July 1970. He fought for five tournaments in the top division and his highest rank was maegashira 7. He retired in January 1976 and became an elder in the Japan Sumo Association under the name Urakaze, working as a coach at Isegahama stable, Kiriyama stable and Asahiyama stable until reaching the mandatory retirement age of 65 in December 2012. The Urakaze name is now held by former maegashira Shikishima.

Career record

See also
Glossary of sumo terms
List of past sumo wrestlers

References

1947 births
Living people
Japanese sumo wrestlers
Sumo people from Osaka Prefecture
People from Minoh, Osaka